The Center for Higher National Studies is a military-training academic institution located in Lima, Peru.

Education in Lima
Military academies